The 2011–12 Deutsche Eishockey Liga season was the 18th season since the founding of the Deutsche Eishockey Liga. Eisbären Berlin won the league championship after posting the top record during the regular season.

Teams

Regular season

GP = Games Played, W = Wins, OTW = Overtime win, SOW = Shootout win, OTL = Overtime loss, SOL = Shootout loss, L = Loss
Color code:  = Direct Playoff qualification,  = Playoff qualification round,  = No playoff

Playoffs

Playoff qualifications
The playoff qualifications were played between March 14, and 16, 2012 in a Best-of-three mode.

Playoff bracket

Quarterfinals
The quarterfinals will be played in a Best-of-seven mode starting March 21 until April 3, 2012.

Semifinals
The semifinals were played in a Best-of-five mode starting April 5 to 11, 2012.

Finals
The finals will be played in a Best-of-five mode starting April 15 to 24, 2012.

References

External links
Official League Website

1
Ger
2011-12